Canis Resort is the world's first luxury dog hotel, located in Freising, north of Munich, Germany. It opened for preview on December 9, 2008, and it was opened to the public from December 15, 2008. The hotel can accommodate up to forty-five dogs in nine heated dog lodges, with trained dog sitters offering full services including grooming, training, health care and exercise, twenty-four seven.

References

External links 

 Official website

Hotels in Germany
Hotels established in 2008
2008 establishments in Germany